The 2013 Asian Development Tour was the fourth season of the Asian Development Tour, a second-tier tour operated by the Asian Tour, and the first season in which Official World Golf Ranking points were offered.

Schedule
The following table lists official events during the 2013 season.

Order of Merit
The Order of Merit was based on prize money won during the season, calculated in U.S. dollars. The top three players on the tour earned status to play on the 2014 Asian Tour.

Notes

References

Asian Development Tour
Asian Development Tour